Malakos means soft in Greek. It may refer to

 Malakia, the Classical Greek term for effeminacy
 Malacology, the study of the invertebrate phylum “Mollusca

See also
 Malakas, a Greek slang word
 Malakas, the first man in Philippine mythology
 Malacus (disambiguation)